The International Union for the Study of Social Insects has at its purpose  to promote and encourage the study of social insects and other social organisms in the broadest sense. Both research and the dissemination of knowledge about social insects and other social organisms through publications, educational programs, and activities are encouraged. The Union further pursues these objectives via the organization of Congresses and Symposia, publication of the journal Insectes Sociaux, and recognition of distinguished service with awards. National and regional sections play a key role in the IUSSI, with the sections organizing meetings, symposia, and newsletters.

The Union was founded in 1951 as a result of discussions at the International Entomological Congress in Amsterdam.  Key figures in the establishment of the IUSSI were Pierre-Paul Grassé (France), T. C. Schneirla (U.S.A.), Carlo Jucci (Italy), K. Gösswald (Germany), D. R. Gonçalves (Brazil), and Tohru Uchida (Japan).  Grassé took the lead in many matters in the early years of the IUSSI, including establishment of the Union's quarterly scientific journal, published since 1954, called Insectes Sociaux.

The Union was also originally referred to by its name in French, L'Union Internationale pour l'Étude des Insectes Sociaux, or UIEIS

Union Officers include a Secretary-General, who provides overall coordination and management of Union finances, the Editor of Insectes Sociaux, and the President.  These offices are filled by recommendation of the international committee and vote of the general assembly at the Union's quadrennial International Congress.  The President is the scientific organizer for the next International Congress and is a member of the section that will host the next Congress. It follows that the Union is organized into sections based on nationality or geographic region. Each section has its own activities, possibly including meetings and publications.

Secretaries-General
Until the 1973 Congress in London, the IUSSI was led by a committee consisting of the Presidents of the sections.  Under the leadership of Charles D.  Michener and G. LeMasne, a new constitution was adopted at the London Congress and the position of Secretary-General was created.  Philip Howse of the University of Southampton was elected the first Secretary-General.  
  2022-present Mark Brown
  2014-2022 Madeleine Beekman
  2006-2014 Joan Herbers
  2002-2006 Wolfgang Kirchner
  1994-2002 Michael Breed
  1986-1994 Hayo Velthuis
  1977-1986 Philip Howse

Editors, Insectes Sociaux
 Madeleine Beekman 2022-present
 Miriam Richards 2018-2022
 Michael Breed 2014-2018
 Johan Billen 1991-2014
 Pierre Jaisson 1982-1990
 Hubert Montagner 1973-1982
 Jacques Lecomte 1963-1972
 G. Richard 1954-1962

Sections
  African Section
  Australian Section 
  Bolivarian Section (Spanish speaking Latin America) 
  Brazilian Section 
  Central European Section (former German Section) 
  French Section 
  Indian Section 
  Italian Section 
  Japanese Section 
  North American Section 
  Northwest European Section (former British Section) 
  Russian-speaking Section

Congresses
 XIX Congress of the IUSSI, 03.07 - 07.07, 2022, San Diego, California, United States
President: Jennifer Fewell, Arizona State University
 XVIII Congress of the IUSSI, 2018, Guarujá, Sao Paulo State, Brasil
President: Klaus Hartfelder, University of São Paulo
 XVII Congress of the IUSSI, 13.07 - 18.07, 2014, Cairns, Australia, 2014 Congress site
President: Benjamin Oldroyd, University of Sydney

Proceedings: http://www.iussi2014.com/downloads/IUSSI2014_Abstract_Book.pdf
 XVI International Congress of the IUSSI, 08.08 - 14.08, 2010, Copenhagen, Denmark, 2010 Congress site
President: Jacobus Boomsma, University of Denmark, Copenhagen

Proceedings: http://www.iussi.org/IUSSI2010/Media/IUSSI2010AbstractBook.pdf 
 XV Congress of the IUSSI, 30.07 - 04.08, 2006, Washington, D.C., United States
President: Walter Tschinkel, Florida State University
 XIV Congress of the IUSSI, 27.07 - 03.08, 2002, Sapporo, Japan
President: Tadao Matsumoto

Proceedings: Kikuchi, T. N., N. Azuma and S. Higashi, eds. 2003. Genes, Behaviors and Evolution of Social Insects (314 pp). Hokkaido University Press ISBN： 978-4-8329-0317-3

 XIII Congress of the IUSSI, 29.12.98 - 04.01.99, 1998, Adelaide, Australia
President: Ross Crozier
 XII Congress of the IUSSI, 21.08 - 27.08, 1994, Paris, France
President: Pierre Jaisson, University of Paris XIII, Villetaneuse

Proceedings: Lenoir, Alain, Gérard Arnold & Michel Lepage, eds. Les insectes sociaux : UIEIS 94 : 12ème congrès de l'Union internationale pour l'étude des insectes sociaux, Paris, Sorbonne, 21-27 août 1994 = IUSSI 94 : 12th congress of the International union for the study of social insects /  Villetaneuse : Publications Université Paris Nord, 1994. xxiv, 583 p. ; 22 cm. 

 XI Congress of the IUSSI, 05.08 - 11.08, 1990, Bangalore, India
President: G. K. Veeresh

Proceedings: Veeresh, G. K., B. Mallik, and C. A. Viraktamath. 1991. Social Insects and the Environment: Proceedings of the 11th International Congress of Iussi, 1990 (International Union for the Study of Social Insects) Brill Academic Pub 
 X Congress of the IUSSI, 18.08 - 22.08, 1986, Munich, Germany President: Heinz Rembold

Proceedings: Eder, Jörg and Heinz Rembold, eds. 1987.  Chemistry and biology of social insects: proceedings of the 10th International Congress, München, August 18–22, 1986, IUSSI (International Union for the Study of Social Insects)  Munchen : Peperny, 1987. 

 IX Congress of the IUSSI, 1982, Boulder, Colorado, United States President: Professor Charles D. Michener, University of Kansas

Proceedings:  Breed, M.D., Michener, C.D., Evans, H.E., eds. 1982. The biology of social insects: Proceedings of the 9th Congress of the IUSSI. Westview Press: Boulder. 419 + xii pp. 
 VIII Congress of the IUSSI, 05.09 - 11.09, 1977, Wageningen, Netherlands
President: J. de Wilde

Proceedings: 
Velthuis, H.H.W. and J.T.Wiebes 1977. Proceedings of the Eighth International Congress of the International Union for the Study of Social Insects, Wageningen, the Netherlands, September 5–10, 1977. Wageningen : Centre for Agricultural Publishing and Documentation,  

 VII Congress of the IUSSI, 10.09 - 15.09, 1973, London, United Kingdom
President:  C. G. Butler

Proceedings: Proceedings of the International Union for the Study of Social Insects VIIth International Congress, London, 10–15 September 1973. c/o Dr P.E. Howse, Department of Zoology, The University, Highfield, Southampton SO9 5NH, 1973. vi, 418 p. 
 VI Congress of the IUSSI, 15.09 - 20.09, 1969, Bern, Switzerland
President: Martin Lüscher 
Honorary President: Professor P. P. Grassé

Proceedings: Proceedings of the VI Congress, Bern, 15–20 September 1969. Bern, Zoological Institute, University of Bern, 1969 309 p.

 V Congress of the IUSSI, 05.07 - 10.07, 1965, Toulouse, France

President: Jacques LeComte, Station de Recherches sur l'Abeille et les Insectes Sociaux, Bures-Sur-Yvette

 IV Congress of the IUSSI (IV Congresso dell'UIES), 09.09 - 14.09, 1961, Pavia, Italy
President: Carlo Jucci 
 III Congress of the IUSSI (III Congres De L'Union), 09.07 - 13.07, 1957, Paris, France
President: P. P. Grassé
 II Congress of the IUSSI (II Internationalen Kongresses), 03.04-06.04, 1955, Würzburg, Germany
President: K. Gösswald
 I Congress of the IUSSI, 1952, Paris, France
 Foundation of the IUSSI, 1951, Amsterdam, Netherlands

Special IUSSI symposium: Noirot  Ch., P.E. Howse, G. Le Masne., eds. 1975. Pheromones and defensive secretions in social insects : the proceedings of a symposium [of the International Union for the Study of Social Insects], held on 18th, 19 and 20 September 1975, at the University of Dijon /  Dijon : French Section of the I.U.S.S.I., 1975. vii, 248 p. : ill. ; 21 cm.

See also
Apiology
Eusociality
Myrmecology

References

External links
Official website

Organizations established in 1951
Entomological organizations
International scientific organizations